Three Fingered Jenny is a 1916 American silent short mystery directed by Edward LeSaint written by Harvey Gates. Starring William Garwood in the lead role, it was the third film in the five film series of Lord John's Journal.

Cast
William Garwood as Lord John
Stella Razeto as Maida Odell
Carmen Phillips as Jenny
Malcolm Blevins as Richard Wayne
Laura Oakley as Head Sister
Albert MacQuarrie as Doctor Ramese

See also
Lord John in New York (1915)
The Grey Sisterhood (1916)
The Eye of Horus (1916)
The League of the Future (1916)

References

External links

1916 films
American silent short films
American black-and-white films
American mystery films
Films directed by Edward LeSaint
1916 mystery films
1916 short films
1910s American films
Silent mystery films